Alfred Kogler was an Austrian luger who competed in the 1970s to mid-1980s. A natural track luger, he won a complete set of medals at the FIL World Luge Natural Track Championships with a gold in men's singles (1984), a silver in men's doubles (1982), and a bronze in men's doubles (1984).

Kogler also won two medals in the men's singles event at the FIL European Luge Natural Track Championships with a gold in 1975 and a bronze in 1978.

References
Natural track European Championships results 1970-2006.
Natural track World Championships results: 1979-2007

Austrian male lugers
Living people
Year of birth missing (living people)